Kader Khan (22 October 1937  31 December 2018) was an Indian actor, film director, comedian and screenwriter in Bollywood from the 1970s–2010s.

Filmography

Actor
{|class="wikitable sortable"
! No
! Year
! Title
! Role
! Notes
|-
|1
| 1971
| Fajr Al Islam
| Voice
| Narrator in Hindi Version
|-
|2
| 1973
| Daag
| Prosecuting Attorney
|  Debut as actor 
|-
|3
| rowspan="5" | 1974
| Gupt Gyaan
| Professor #4
|
|-
|4
| Sagina
| Anupam Dutt
| 
|-
|5
| Benaam
| Voice on telephone
| Prem Chopra's Voice over
|-
|6
| Goonj
| Police Inspector
| 
|-
|7
| Dil Diwana
| Advocate
|
|-
|8
| 1975
| Anari
| Viren
| Labour Union Leader
|-
|9
| rowspan="5" | 1976
| Noor-E-Ilaahi
| Fakeer Baba
|
|-
|10
| Zamane Se Poocho
| 
|
|-
|11
| Maha Chor
| Villain
| First film as villain 
|-
|12
| Adalat
| Police Inspector Khan
|
|-
|13
| Bairaag
| Superintendent of Police
| 
|-
|14
| rowspan="7" | 1977
| Hunterwali 77
| Goon
|
|-
|15
| Khoon Pasina
| Thakur Zalim Singh
| First Main Role
|-
|16
| Chhailla Babu
| Scorpion
| Voice-over
|-
|17
| Mukti
| Hussain
|
|-
|18
| Parvarish
| Supremo
|
|-
|19
| Chor Sipahee
| Munshilal 
| BMC Worker
|-
|20
| Agar... If
| Davar
|
|-
|21
| rowspan="5" | 1978
| Atyachaar
| Goon
|
|-
|22
| Bhola Bhala
| Nathiya
| Voice-over
|-
|23
| Muqaddar Ka Sikandar
| Darvesh Baba / Fakeer
| Cameo Appearance
|-
|24
| Shalimar
| Goon
| Dubbed for Rex Harrison
|-
|25
| Chowki No.11
| Krishna / K. K.
| 
|-
|26
| rowspan="3" | 1979
| Mr. Natwarlal
| Mukhiya / Baba
|
|-
|27
| Suhaag
| Jaggi
|
|-
|28
| Zulm Ki Pukar
| Goon
|
|-
|29
| rowspan="11" | 1980
| Room No. 203
| Goon
| 
|-
|30
| Dhan Daulat
| Military Officer
| Cameo Appearance
|-
|31
| Do Aur Do Paanch
| Jagdish
| 
|-
|32
| Lootmaar
| Goon
|
|-
|33
| Jyoti Bane Jwala
| Dharamdas
|
|-
|34
| Qurbani
| Joe
| 
|-
|35
| Be-Reham
| P. K.
|
|-
|36
| Jwalamukhi
| P. D.
|
|-
|37
| Abdullah
| Military Officer
|
|-
|38
| Unees-Bees
| Yaqub Khan
|
|-
|39
| Ganga Aur Suraj
| Daku Vikram Singh
|
|-
|40
| rowspan="15" | 1981
| Sadqa Kamliwale Ka
| Fakeer
|
|-
|41
| Kasam Bhawani Ki
| Daaku
|
|-
|42
| Bulundi
| Madan Teja
| 
|-
|43
| Naseeb
| Raghuvir 
| 
|-
|44
| Ahista Ahista
| Patron
|
|-
|45
| Yaarana
| Johnny
|
|-
|46
| Shakka
| Qasim Bhai
| 
|-
|47
| Shama
| Dinu 'Munshi'
| Writer & Producer
|-
|48
| Fiffty Fiffty
| Diwan Shamsher Singh
| 
|-
|49
| Gehra Zakhm
| Neelam Bhai
|
|-
|50
| Meri Aawaz Suno
| Topiwala
|
|-
|51
| Kaalia
| Shyamu
| 
|-
|52
| Zamane Ko Dikhana Hai
| Shekhar Nanda
| 
|-
|53
| Waqt Ki Deewar
| Lala Kedarnath
|
|-
|54
| Raaz
| Inspector Khan
|
|-
|55
| rowspan="14" | 1982
| Satte Pe Satta
| Narrator
| Voice-over
|-
|56
| Vakil Babu
| Goon
| Cameo Appearance
|-
|57
| Teesri Aankh
| Baba
| Sagar's Guardian
|-
|58
| Desh Premee
| Sher Singh
|
|-
|59
| Sanam Teri Kasam
| Ramlal Sharma / Seth Manhorilal
| 
|-
|60
| Badle Ki Aag
| Shambhu / Rajaram
| Double Role
|-
|61
| Raaj Mahal
| Khan (Royal Family's Loyal)
| Cameo Appearance
|-
|62
| Waqt-Waqt Ki Baat
| Diwan Vikram Singh
|
|-
|63
| Samraat
| Ram & Ranbir's Father
| 
|-
|64
| Pyaar Mein Sauda Nahin
| Goon
|
|-
|65
| Mehndi Rang Layegi
| Tagore Dindayal
|
|-
|66
| Lakshmi
| Daaku Thakur Singh
| 
|-
|67
| Jeeo Aur Jeene Do
| Daaku Sher Singh
|
|-
|68
| Farz Aur Kanoon
| Naagraj
|
|-
|69
| rowspan="14" | 1983
| Salam-E-Mohabbat
| Goon
| Guest Role
|-
|70
| Mangal Pandey
| Inspector Vijay Shukla
|
|-
|71
| Himmatwala
| Narayandas Gopaldas
|  First film as comedian 
|-
|72
| Mahaan
| Simon
|
|-
|73
| Jaani Dost
| Kuber / Cobra
|
|-
|74
| Woh Jo Hasina
| Sardar
|
|-
|75
| Naukar Biwi Ka
| Deshbandu Jagannath / Pinto / Abdul Karim
| 
|-
|76
| Justice Chaudhury
| Advocate Kailashnath
|
|-
|77
| Mawaali
| Ajit
| 
|-
|78
| Coolie
| Zafar Khan
| 
|-
|79
| Raaste Aur Rishte
| 
| 
|-
|80
| Karate
| Don Khan
| 
|-
|81
| Kaise Kaise Log
| Abbas Khan
| 
|-
|82
| Chor Police
| Dr. Singh
| 
|-
|83
| rowspan="22" | 1984
| Mohabbat Ka Masihaa
| Goon
| 
|-
|84
| Meri Adalat
| Mohan Raj
| 
|-
|85
| Inquilaab
| Party Chief Shankar Narayan
| 
|-
|86
| Tohfa
| Raghuvir Singh
| 
|-
|87
| Ghar Ek Mandir
| Dharamdas
| 
|-
|88
| Maqsad
| Naglingam Reddy
| 
|-
|89
| Haisiyat
| Ravi's Father
| 
|-
|90
| Gangvaa
| Chhote Thakur
| 
|-
|91
| Naya Kadam
| Hitler Alok Madhukar
| 
|-
|92
| John Jani Janardhan
| Gajanand 'Gajju'
| 
|-
|93
| Yaadon Ki Zanjeer
| Sher Singh
| 
|-
|94
| Sharara
| K. K.
| 
|-
|95
| Shapath
| Dharamraj
| 
|-
|96
| Qaidi
| Bansilal
| 
|-
|97
| Mera Faisla
| Jacob
| 
|-
|98
| Maya Bazar
| 
| Cameo Appearance
|-
|99
| Kanoon Meri Mutthi Mein
| Daaku Sardar
| Cameo Appearance
|-
|100
| Kaamyab
| Gulaati
| 
|-
|101| Jeene Nahi Doonga| Narrator
| Voice-over
|-
|102
| Captain Barry| Villain
| 
|-
|103
| Bad Aur Badnam| John / Marco
| 
|-
|104
| Akalmand| Zormi
| 
|-
|105
| rowspan="18" | 1985
| Mera Jawab| Inspector Ajay
| 
|-
|106
| Sarfarosh| Dharmadhikari
| 
|-
|107
| Tawaif| Rahim Shaikh
| 
|-
|108
| Ramkali| Thakur Shankar Singh
| 
|-
|109
| Mahaguru| Naagraj Darbari
| 
|-
|110
| Balidaan| Bade
| 
|-
|111
| Pataal Bhairavi| Mantrik Husair
| 
|-
|112
| Ameer Aadmi Gharib Aadmi| Subhash Gaekwad
| 
|-
|113
| Masterji| Jamnadas
| 
|-
|114
| Wafadaar| Damdev Mahadev Rajgiri
| 
|-
|115
| Bepanaah| Dayashankar / Daddu
| 
|-
|116
| Geraftaar| Vidyanath
| 
|-
|117
| Chaar Maharathi| Sulaiman
| 
|-
|118
| Lover Boy| Sunder Lal
| 
|-
|119
| Patthar Dil| Shaukeen Lal Chaurasia
| 
|-
|120
| Hoshiyar| Malpani
| 
|-
|121
| Ghar Dwaar| Shyamlal (Bahadur's Father)
| 
|-
|122
| Aaj Ka Daur| Vishwapratap Gyandev Agnihotri
| 
|-
|123
| rowspan="14" | 1986
| Dilwaala| Sewakram Sitapuri
| 
|-
|124
| Swarag Se Sunder| Milawatram
| 
|-
|125
| Locket| Thakur Veer Pratap Singh
| 
|-
|126
| Dharm Adhikari| Shastri
| 
|-
|127
| Muddat| Thakur Gajendra Singh
| 
|-
|128
| Nasihat| Mohan Lal
| 
|-
|129
| Daku Bijlee| Daku
| 
|-
|130
| Dosti Dushmani| Nishaan
| 
|-
|131
| Suhaagan| Masterji
| 
|-
|132
| Singhasan| Mahamantri Bhanupratap
| 
|-
|133
| Inteqaam Ki Aag| Kalluram
| 
|-
|134
| Insaaf Ki Awaaz| Politician Chaurangilal Domukhiya
| 
|-
|135
| Ghar Sansar| Girdharilal / Bankelal
| 
|-
|136
| Aag Aur Shola| College Professor
| 
|-
|137
| rowspan="18" | 1987
| Sachi Ibadat| Goon
| 
|-
|138
| Insaniyat Ke Dushman| Jagmohan
| 
|-
|139
| Maa Beti| Shibbu
| 
|-
|140
| Loha| Jagannath Prasad
| 
|-
|141
| Pyaar Karke Dekho| Sampat Srivastav
| 
|-
|141
| Tera Karam Mera Dharam | Inspector Sinha
| 
|-
|142
| Majaal| Advocate Chaudhary Kailashnath
| 
|-
|143
| Khudgarz| Advocate Batliwala
| 
|-
|144
| Sindoor| Advocate Dharamdas
| 
|-
|145
| Hifazat| Buddhiram 
| 
|-
|146
| Himmat Aur Mehanat| Trilok Chand
| 
|-
|147
| Insaf Ki Pukar| Inspector Imaandaar
| 
|-
|148
| Watan Ke Rakhwale| Raj Puri
| 
|-
|149
| Naam O Nishan| Thakur Jarnail Singh / Jaspal Singh
| 
|-
|150
| Jawab Hum Denge| Janardan
| 
|-
|151
| Ghar Ka Sukh| Mani Prasad
| 
|-
|152
| Besahara| Nawab Rahim Khan
| 
|-
|153
| Apne Apne| Samrat
| 
|-
|154
| rowspan="28" | 1988
| Som Mangal Shani| Noora Seth
| 
|-
|155
| Geeta Ki Saugandh| Sher Khan
| 
|-
|156
| Bijlee Aur Toofan| Abdul Bhai
| 
|-
|157
| Dariya Dil| Dhaniram
| 
|-
|158
| Shahenshah| Inspector Shrivastav
| Vijay's Father 
|-
|159
| Pyar Ka Mandir| Dr. Bhuleshwarchand Bhooljanewala
| 
|-
|160| Shukriyaa| Narrator
| Voice-over
|-
|'''161
| Kasam
| Nathu
| 
|-
|162
| Kab Tak Chup Rahungi
| Gangua
| 
|-
|163| Charnon Ki Saugandh| Chandi Das
| 
|-
|164
| Woh Milie Thi| John
| 
|-
|165
| Sherni| Thakur Dharampal Singh
| 
|-
|166
| Shoorveer| Natwarlal Sharafat Chand
| 
|-
|167
| Ghar Ghar Ki Kahani| Mr. Dhanraj
| 
|-
|168
| Waqt Ki Awaz| Sikander Lal Thakkar
| 
|-
|169
| Soorma Bhopali| Mad Engineer
| Cameo Appearance
|-
|170
| Khoon Bhari Maang| Heeralal
| 
|-
|171
| Biwi Ho To Aisi| Kailash Bhandari
| 
|-
|172
| Ganga Tere Desh Mein| Sewaram
| 
|-
|173
| Paigham| Daaku
| 
|-
|174
| Sone Pe Suhaaga| Bashir Ahmed
| 
|-
|175
| Saazish| Dr. Kalidas
| 
|-
|176
| Pyaar Mohabbat| Seth Dhaniram
| 
|-
|177
| Mulzim| Jago Rajwal
| 
|-
|178
| Mar Mitenge| Pasha
| 
|-
|179
| Inteqam| Narayan
| 
|-
|180
| Bhed Bhav| Fakeer Baba
| Cameo Appearance
|-
|181
| Aurat Teri Yehi Kahani| Ghadbad
| 
|-
|182
| rowspan="18" | 1989
| Izhaar| Villain
| 
|-
|183
| Vardi| Lalchand / Balkishan
| 
|-
|184
| Gair Kaanooni| Deepak Dalaal
| 
|-
|185
| Bade Ghar Ki Beti| Munimji
| 
|-
|186
| Nishane Bazi| Police Officer
| 
|-
|187
| Billoo Baadshah| Thanthan Tiwari
| 
|-
|188
| Jaisi Karni Waisi Bharni| Gangaram Verma
| 
|-
|189
| Paraya Ghar| Kudrat
| 
|-
|190
| Dost| Buddhi
| Sher's Nephew
|-
|191
| Sikka| Daruka
| 
|-
|192
| Kala Bazaar| Kimtilal
| 
|-
|193
| Kanoon Apna Apna| Bhushannath 'Dharmendra' Bhadbole
| 
|-
|194
| Chaalbaaz| Fake Beggar
| Cameo Appearance
|-
|195
| Tujhe Nahin Chhodunga| Villain
| 
|-
|196
| Teri Payal Mere Geet| C.I. Jhanjhotia
| 
|-
|197
| Majboor| Teli Ram / Chameli ram
| 
|-
|198
| Hum Bhi Insaan Hain| Dharampal
| 
|-
|199
| Awara Zindagi| Vilain
| 
|-
|200
| rowspan="13" | 1990
| Meri Lalkaar| Top Singh Hawaldar
| 
|-
|201
| Baap Numbri Beta Dus Numbri| Raman
| 
|-
|202
| Sher Dil| Shobraj / Lobhraj
| 
|-
|203
| Apmaan Ki Aag| Retd. Col. Suryadev Singh
| 
|-
|204
| Shera Shamshera| Daaku
| 
|-
|205
| Shandar| Rai Bahadur Arjun Chaurasia
| 
|-
|206
| Qayamat Ki Raat| Villain
| 
|-
|207
| Pyar Ka Karz| Havaldar / Sub-Inspector Nakedar Subedar Thandedar Sapotdar
| 
|-
|208
| Pyar Ka Devta| Pritam
| 
|-
|209
| Muqaddar Ka Badshaah| Inspector Gulshan
| 
|-
|210
| Jawani Zindabad| Balmukut Mama Banarasi
| 
|-
|211
| Kishen Kanhaiya| Munshi
| 
|-
|212
| Ghar Ho To Aisa| Bajrangi / Bajrangi's Father
| 
|-
|213
| rowspan="16" | 1991
| Princess from Kathmandu| Comedian
| 
|-
|214
| Hum| General Rana Pratap Singh / Chittor
| 
|-
|215
| Khoon Ka Karz| Champaklal / Hitler Champaklal / Ravan Champaklal
|
|-
|216
| Karz Chukana Hai| Atmaram
| Released in Bengali as (Rin Shodh)
|-
|217
| Ramwati| Hawaldaar
| 
|-
|218
| Do Matwale| Gorakhnath
| 
|-
|219
| Nachnewale Gaanewale| Jaggu
| 
|-
|220
| Swarg Yahan Narak Yahan| Jagatram
| 
|-
|221
| Indrajeet| Minister Sadachari
| 
|-
|222
| Saajan| Rajiv Verma
| 
|-
|223
| Yaara Dildara| Police Inspector
| 
|-
|224
| Trinetra| Shyaam
| 
|-
|225
| Sapnon Ka Mandir| Maula Baba
| 
|-
|226
| Phoolwati| Hawaldaar
| 
|-
|227
| Ghar Parivar| Munshi
| 
|-
|228
| Ganga Jamuna Ki Lalkaar| Daaku
| 
|-
|229
| rowspan="23" | 1992
| Rajoo Dada| Don Jwala
| 
|-
|230
| Meri Janeman| Makkhan Lal
| 
|-
|231
| Dil Hi To Hai| Thakur Karan Singh
| 
|-
|232
| Vansh| Havaldar Imandar
| 
|-
|233
| Mera Dil Tere Liye| Principal Sinha
| 
|-
|234
| Suryavanshi| Baba
| 
|-
|235
| Parasmani| Daku Ibrahim Khan / Baba Malang
|
|-
|236
| Basanti Tangewali| Police Inspector / Khan
| 
|-
|237
| Tyagi| Choudhry Gangaprasad Dayal
| 
|-
|238
| Ganga Bani Shola| Police Commissioner
| 
|-
|239
| Bol Radha Bol| Jugnu
| 
|-
|240
| Honeymoon| Dhaniram
| 
|-
|241
| Humshakal| D.D. / Devi Dutt / Dard Ka Dariya
| 
|-
|242
| Angaar| Jahangir Khan
| 
|-
|243
| Ghar Jamai| Pyarelal
| 
|-
|244
| Kamsin| Chacha Ji
| 
|-
|245
| Daulat Ki Jung| K.K. Topji / Sher Khan
|
|-
|246
| Umar 55 Ki Dil Bachpan Ka| Dhaniram / Maniram
|
|-
|247
| Nagin Aur Lootere| Thief
| 
|-
|248
| Maa| Ravikant
| 
|-
|249
| Kasak| Hasmukh Sharma
| 
|-
|250
| Insaaf Ki Devi| Advocate Kanooni Lal
| 
|-
|251
| Ganga Ki Vachan| Daaku
| 
|-
|252
| rowspan="18" | 1993
| Apaatkaal| Villain
| 
|-
|253
| Kayda Kanoon| Mirza Lucknowi
| 
|-
|254
| Badi Bahen| Ram
| 
|-
|255
| Rang| Mahadev Singh
| 
|-
|256
| Dil Hai Betaab| Parshuram
| 
|-
|255
| Gurudev| Inspector Khan
| 
|-
|256
| Hum Hain Kamaal Ke| Pitambar
| 
|-
|257
| Dil Tera Aashiq| Naseeb Kumar
| 
|-
|258
| Aulad Ke Dushman| Ahuja (College Vice-Principal)
| 
|-
|259
| Dhanwan| Jagmohan Chopra
| 
|-
|260
| Shatranj| Dharamraj D. Verma
| 
|-
|261
| Zakhmo Ka Hisaab| Gyaani
| 
|-
|261
| Meherbaan| Biku
| 
|-
|262
| Jeevan Ki Shatranj| Havaldar No.100
| 
|-
|263
| Dosti Ki Saugandh| Kader Khan
| 
|-
|264
| Chahoonga Main Tujhe| Seth Pyaare Lal
| 
|-
|265
| Aashik Awara| Jaggu
| 
|-
|266
| Aankhen| Hasmukh Rai
| 
|-
|267
| rowspan="16" | 1994
| Rakhwale| Police Commissioner
| 
|-
|268
| Raja Babu| Kishan Singh
| 
|-
|269
| Prem Shakti| Romeo
| 
|-
|270
| Insaaf Apne Lahoo Se| Hardwari Lal
| 
|-
|271
| Saajan Ka Ghar| Uncle
| 
|-
|272
| Pehla Pehla Pyar| Dharam Pal / Streetside Vendor / Grocer
| Multiple Roles
|-
|273
| Mohabbat Ki Arzoo| Dr. Anand
| 
|-
|274
| Aatish| Kadar Bhaai
| 
|-
|275
| Eena Meena Deeka| Dabba (Beggar)
| 
|-
|276
| Aag| Tolaram
| 
|-
|277
| Main Khiladi Tu Anari| DCP / Constable Ramlal
|
|-
|278
| Ghar Ki Izzat| Ram Kumar
| 
|-
|279
| Mr. Azaad| Hiravat Mishra
| 
|-
|280
| Khuddar| Kanhaiyalal
| 
|-
|281
| Chhoti Bahoo| Durga's Husband
| 
|-
|282
| Andaz| Principal
| 
|-
|283
| rowspan="14" | 1995
| Andaz| Magan Lal
| 
|-
|284
| The Don| Chaprasi Rajaram / Principal Amarnath / Prof. Raghav
|
|-
|285
| Taqdeerwala| Yamraj
| 
|-
|286
| Anokha Andaaz| Kadar Khan
| 
|-
|287
| Taaqat| Master Dinanath
| 
|-
|288
| Coolie No. 1| Choudhry Hoshiarchand Shikarpuri Bakulwala
| 
|-
|289
| Hulchul| Chachaji
| 
|-
|290
| Oh Darling! Yeh Hai India!| Bidder
| 
|-
|291
| Veer| Agarwal / Advocate Vishwanath
| 
|-
|292
| Yaraana| Rai Saheb
| 
|-
|293
| Diya Aur Toofan| Gyaneshwar
| The genius who gave the idea of Brain Transplant
|-
|294
| Vartmaan| Professor
| 
|-
|295
| Surakshaa| Manager
| 
|-
|296
| Jallaad| Kamalnath/K.K.
| 
|-
|297
| rowspan="9" | 1996
| Sindoor Ki Holi| Inspector Munne Khan
| 
|-
|298
| Saajan Chale Sasural| Mr. Khurana
| 
|-
|299
| Maahir| Jailor
| 
|-
|300
| Rangbaaz| Judge Kapoor / Father Kanhaya
|
|-
|301
| Sapoot| Mr. Singhania
| 
|-
|302
| Chhote Sarkar| Jagmohan / ACP Chandra Bedi
| 
|-
|303
| Ek Tha Raja| Lalchand Dogra
| 
|-
|304
| Bhishma| Jaunpuri
| 
|-
|305
| Aatank| D'Costa
| 
|-
|306
| rowspan="16" | 1997
| Allah Meharban To Gadha Pehalwan| Havaldaar Imaandar Singh
| 
|-
|307
| Judaai| Kaajal's Father
| 
|-
|308
| Judwaa| Sharma Ji
| 
|-
|309
| Hero No. 1| Dhanraj Malhotra
| 
|-
|310
| Banarasi Babu| Mr. Chaubey
| 
|-
|311
| Zameer| Astrologer Ram Prasad
| 
|-
|312
| Tarazu| Khan Hindustani
| 
|-
|313
| Ek Phool Teen Kante| Kidnapper Khopadi
| 
|-
|314
| Hameshaa| Raju's Chacha
| 
|-
|315
| Deewana Mastana| Marriage Registrar
| 
|-
|316
| Mr. and Mrs. Khiladi| Badri Prasad
| 
|-
|317
| Bhai| Inspector Lalit Kapoor
| 
|-
|318
| Shapath| Chaurasiya
| 
|-
|319
| Sanam| Khan Bahadur
| 
|-
|320
| Naseeb| Master Chaban
| 
|-
|321
| Daadagiri| Dinanath
| 
|-
|322
| rowspan="13" | 1998
| Maha-Yuddh| Chacha Sohan Lal
| 
|-
|323
| Aag Aur Tezaab| Conman
| 
|-
|324
| Jaane Jigar| Ghanshayam
| 
|-
|325
| Aunty No. 1| Rai Bahadur Behl
| 
|-
|326
| Mard| Minister Gulam Kalim Azad
| 
|-
|327
| Gharwali Baharwali| Hiralal Verma
| 
|-
|328
| Dulhe Raja| K.K. Singhania
| 
|-
|329
| Bade Miyan Chote Miyan| Waiter / Kadar Bhai
| 
|-
|330
| Hero Hindustani| Topi
| 
|-
|331
|Kudrat| Dada Ji
| 
|-
|332
| Tirchhi Topiwale| Sanam's dad
| 
|-
|333
| Phool Bane Patthar| Choudhry Bhavani Singh / Dadhu
| 
|-
|334
| Mere Do Anmol Ratan| Major Bhagawat Singh
| 
|-
|335
| rowspan="11" | 1999
| Sikandar Sadak Ka| Mr. Dilchasp
| 
|-
|336
| Aa Ab Laut Chalen| Sardaar Khan
| 
|-
|337
| Anari No. 1| K.K.
| 
|-
|338
| Sooryavansham| Major Ranjit Singh
| 
|-
|339
| Rajaji| Sarpanch Shivnath
| 
|-
|340
| Haseena Maan Jaayegi| Seth Amirchand
| 
|-
|341
| Hindustan Ki Kasam| Dr. Dastoor
| 
|-
|342
| Sanyasi Mera Naam| Bhootnath
| 
|-
|343
| Jaanwar| Singer at Temple
| 
|-
|344
| Sirf Tum| Phone Booth Operator
| 
|-
|345
| Nyaydaata| Yaadram
| 
|-
|346
| rowspan="7" | 2000
| Dulhan Hum Le Jayenge| Mr. Oberoi
| 
|-
|347
| Krodh| Balwant
| 
|-
|348
| Joru Ka Ghulam| Dyaneshwarprasad Pitamber
| 
|-
|349
| Kunwara| Vishwanath Pratap Singh
| 
|-
|350
| Dhadkan| Singer (Dulhe Ka Shehra song)
| 
|-
|351
| Tera Jadoo Chal Gayaa| Mr. Oberoi (Boss)
| 
|-
|352
| Billa No. 786| Sufi Singer
| 
|-
|353
| rowspan="2" | 2001
| Ittefaq| Gujjumal Hiranandani
| 
|-
|354
| Dial 100| Kamal Bihari
| 
|-
|355
| rowspan="9" | 2002
| Haan Maine Bhi Pyaar Kiya| Babban Miyan
| 
|-
|356
| Badhaai Ho Badhaai| Ghuman Singh Rathod
| 
|-
|357
| Yeh Hai Jalwa| Purshottam Mittal
| 
|-
|358
| Akhiyon Se Goli Maare| Akhendra "Topichand" Bhangare/Rana Bishambharnath
| 
|-
|359
| Waah! Tera Kya Kehna| Murrari
| 
|-
|360
| Jeena Sirf Merre Liye| Mahendra Malhotra
| 
|-
|361
| Chalo Ishq Ladaaye| Kokibhai
| 
|-
|362
| Sindoor Ki Saugandh| Majid Shola / Inspector Asli Tandoor Khan
|
|-
|363
| Angaar: The Fire| Doctor K.K.
| 
|-
|364
| rowspan="3" | 2003
| Basti| Narrator
| 
|-
|365
| Parwana| Ismailbhai Muskurahat
| 
|-
|366
| Fun2shh| Bhaleram / Goatherd
|
|-
|367
| rowspan="3" | 2004
| Kaun Hai Jo Sapno Mein Aaya| Kuldeep Khanna
| 
|-
|368
| Suno Sasurjee| Raj K. Saxena
| 
|-
|369
| Mujhse Shaadi Karogi| Mr. O.B. Duggal
| 
|-
|370
| rowspan="3" | 2005
| Lucky| Doctor
| 
|-
|371
| Khullam Khulla Pyaar Karen| Goverdhan
| 
|-
|372
| Koi Mere Dil Mein Hai| Vikram Malhotra
| 
|-
|373
| rowspan="3" | 2006
| Family| Kalim Khan
| 
|-
|374
| Jigyaasa| Nand Kishore
| 
|-
|375
| Umar| Iqbal Khan
| 
|-
|376
| rowspan="3" | 2007
| Undertrial| Advocate Ravi Vishnoi
| 
|-
|377
| Old Iss Gold| Jayprakash Mital
| 
|-
|378
| Jahan Jaaeyega Hamen Paaeyega| Kiran's Dad
| 
|-
|379
| rowspan="2" | 2008
| Mehbooba| Advocate Sahid
| 
|-
|380
| Deshdrohi| Abdul - Fruit vendor
| 
|-
|381
| rowspan="2" | 2013
| Desh Pardesh| Dada
| Bhojpuri Film
|-
|382
| Deewana Main Deewana| Basant's Dad
| 
|-
|383
| 2015
| Hogaya Dimaagh Ka Dahi| Ishwar Singh Chauhan
| 
|-
|}

Producer
 Shama (1981)

Screenwriter

 Jawani Diwani (1972)
 Rafuchakkar (1972)
 Khel Khel Mein (1972) Benaam (1974)
 Roti (1974)
 Amar Akbar Anthony (1977)
 Khoon Pasina (1977)
 Dharam Veer (1977)
 Parvarish (1977)
 Muqaddar Ka Sikandar (1978)
 Suhaag (1979)
 Mr. Natwarlal (1979)Abdullah (1980)
 Yaarana (1981)
 Desh Premee (1982)
 Lawaaris (1982)
 Khud-Daar (1982)Namak Halaal (1982)
 Coolie (1983)
 Kaamyab (1984)
 Maqsad (1984)
 Qaidi (1984)
 Sharaabi (1984)
 Hoshiyar (1985)
 Balidaan (1985)Mahaguru (1985)Aaj Ka Daur (1985)
 Singhasan (1986)Swarag Se Sunder (1986)Watan Ke Rakhwale (1987)Majaal (1987)Hifazat (1987)
 Hatya (1988)Waqt Ki Awaz (1988)
 Gangaa Jamunaa Saraswati (1988)
 Khoon Bhari Maang (1988)
 Jaisi Karni Waisi Bharnii (1989)Dost (1989)Baap Numbri Beta Dus Numbri (1990)
 Honeymoon (1992)Angaar (1992)Shatranj (1993)Ghar Ki Izzat (1994)Taqdeerwala (1995)
 Diya Aur Toofan (1995)
 Coolie No. 1 (1995)Saajan Chale Sasural (1996)
 Bhai (1997)
 Aunty No. 1 (1998)Hero Hindustani (1998)

Television
 Hasna Mat Mr. Dhansukh Hi! Padosi... Kaun Hai Doshi?''

Awards and nominations

 2013: Sahitya Shiromani Award for his work and contributions to Hindi Film industry and Cinema.
 Khan was recognized twice by the AFMI (American Federation of Muslims from India) for his achievements and service to the Muslim community in India.

References

Indian filmographies
Male actor filmographies